Babyz is a computer game in which one can play with and take care of a group of babies who live in a virtual house on the computer. The game was released in 1999 by The Learning Company and developed by PF Magic.

Gameplay
Babyz runs on top of the Petz 3 game engine, adding additional AI and voice recognition. Players can teach their Babyz how to talk, how to play with objects, and how to walk. Babyz can form relationships with other babyz that can result in sibling rivalries or friendships. At release, there were 15 babyz you could adopt and care for, as well as various toys that babyz could interact with. There are different rooms to explore and numerous clothing items. Babyz reused some of the Petz toyz and had a similar home setting for its play scenes.

Third-party content
A Babyz Community launched on the official site, which has since been shut down. The website offered adoptions and discussions. It was discovered that one could hex edit the babyz to introduce new features, called "hexies" or "hexed babyz". These were available on fan websites alongside other custom content.

Babyz was originally made for the Windows 95/98 Platform, however with the creation of a patch by Nicholas Sherlock, the game can be played on modern Windows. Sherlock's patch, called "Petz A" as it was intended for both Petz and Babyz, made the game run much smoother, with the ability to control many aspects of the game that users originally could not.

Related titles
Petz
Oddballz

References

External links

===Papers===
Creating Emotional Relationships with Virtual Characters
Virtual Babyz: Believable Agents with Narrative Intelligence
New York Times discussion

1999 video games
Virtual baby video games
Ubisoft games
PF Magic games
Video games developed in the United States
Windows games
Windows-only games
Single-player video games
Mindscape games